Mikael Andersson (born February 3, 1972 in Örebro) is a Swedish footballer who plays as a midfielder. Andersson was playing for Örebro before joining Dundee United on loan for one month in November 1997. After making three appearances, Andersson returned to Sweden. After the season 2003 he ended his football career.

References

External links 
 
 Career stats form the time in Örebro SK, sportklubben.net

See also
 Dundee United F.C. season 1997-98

1972 births
Living people
Swedish footballers
Scottish Football League players
Dundee United F.C. players
Örebro SK players
Expatriate footballers in Scotland
Sportspeople from Örebro
Swedish expatriate footballers

Association football midfielders